The 2014–15 Presbyterian Blue Hose men's basketball team represented Presbyterian College during the 2014–15 NCAA Division I men's basketball season. The Blue Hose, led by 26th year head coach Gregg Nibert, played their home games at the Templeton Physical Education Center and were members of the Big South Conference. They finished the season 10–22, 6–12 in Big South play to finish in eighth place. They lost in the first round of the Big South tournament to Longwood.

Roster

Schedule

|-
!colspan=9 style="background:#0060AA; color:#A80436;"| Regular season

|-
!colspan=9 style="background:#0060AA; color:#A80436;"| Big South tournament

References

Presbyterian Blue Hose men's basketball seasons
Presbyterian